Montserrat "Montse" Tomé Vázquez (born 11 May 1982) is a Spanish former football midfielder who most recently played for Oviedo Moderno in Spain's Segunda División. She has also played for Levante UD and FC Barcelona in Primera División, winning the championship with both teams.

A former U-19 Euro runner-up, Tomé was a member of the senior national team during the 2005 Euro qualifying.

Titles
 2 national leagues: 2008, 2012
 1 national cup: 2011

References

Spanish women's footballers
1982 births
Living people
Spain women's international footballers
FC Barcelona Femení players
Primera División (women) players
Levante UD Femenino players
Footballers from Oviedo
Women's association football midfielders
Real Oviedo (women) players